Nathan LaFayette (born February 17, 1973) is a Canadian former ice hockey player in the NHL. He was drafted by the St. Louis Blues in the 3rd round (65th overall) of the 1991 NHL Entry Draft. He played for the St. Louis Blues, Vancouver Canucks, New York Rangers, and Los Angeles Kings. He played 187 regular season NHL games and scored 9 points in 20 playoff games.

Playing career

On April 10, 2008, LaFayette was interviewed on the Team 1040 BMac & Rintoul sports radio morning show on the "Where are they now" feature. He stated that due to injuries, his career was cut short.

Amateur
Lafayette was the CHL Scholastic Player of the Year in the 1991–92 season, while he was a member of the Cornwall Royals. He also played for the Kingston Frontenacs (1989–90, 1990–91) and the Newmarket Royals (1992–93), all of the OHL. His best year as an amateur came in 1992-93 when he scored 49 goals for the Newmarket Royals and helped Canada win the gold medal at the World Junior Championships.

Professional

LaFayette was drafted by the St. Louis Blues in the 3rd round (65th overall) of the 1991 NHL Entry Draft. He scored his first NHL point, an assist, on January 14, 1994 vs. the Edmonton Oilers setting up a two-on-one for Craig Janney and Brendan Shanahan, and Shanahan scored the goal. The Blues had intended for LaFayette to play at their minor league affiliate, the Peoria Rivermen, for the whole season, but due to injuries, he played 38 NHL games with the Blues before being traded.

On March 21, 1994, LaFayette was traded with teammates Bret Hedican and Jeff Brown to the Vancouver Canucks in exchange for the rights to Craig Janney. After sitting out the first four playoff games for Vancouver, he recorded nine points in the next 20 games. He tied his Vancouver Canuck teammate, Bret Hedican, for the +/- lead in the 1994 playoffs with a total of +13. He remains best known as the player who hit the post in the final minutes of the 1994 finals between the Rangers and the Canucks in Game 7.

On April 7, 1995, Lafayette was traded to the New York Rangers for goaltender Corey Hirsch. He played five games with the Rangers, while playing 57 games with their minor league affiliate, the Binghamton Rangers.

On March 14, 1996, LaFayette was again part of a blockbuster trade, going to the Los Angeles Kings with Ray Ferraro, Ian Laperriere, Mattias Norstrom and the Rangers' 1997 4th round pick (99th overall - Sean Blanchard), in exchange for Jari Kurri, Marty McSorley, and Shane Churla. During his time there, he played right wing as well as center. Lafayette suspects that he suffered two concussions in one game with the Los Angeles Kings, which contributed to his hockey career being cut short. He retired in 1999 after splitting the season between the Kings and the Long Beach Ice Dogs.

International play
In 1993, LaFayette won a gold medal at the 1993 World Junior Ice Hockey Championships, representing Canada.

Personal life
LaFayette was born in New Westminster, British Columbia, but grew up in Mississauga, Ontario.

After LaFayette retired from hockey in 2000, he joined Travel Guard Canada. The company, an arm of Travel Guard International, offered travel insurance plans to Canadian travellers. As of 2010, he resides in Oakville with his wife, Sherry and two children; a daughter, Piper and son, Hudson. He continues his work as an insurance executive.

Career statistics

Regular season and playoffs

International

 All statistics are from eliteprospects.com

Transactions
March 21, 1994: Traded to Vancouver by St. Louis with Jeff Brown and Bret Hedican for Craig Janney, March 21, 1994.

April 7, 1995: Traded to New York Rangers by Vancouver for Corey Hirsch, April 7, 1995.

March 14, 1996: Traded to Los Angeles by NY Rangers with Ray Ferraro, Mattias Norstrom, Ian Laperriere and NY Rangers' 4th round choice (Sean Blanchard) in 1997 Entry Draft for Marty McSorley, Jari Kurri and Shane Churla, March 14, 1996.

Awards

OHL

References

External links

1973 births
Living people
Black Canadian ice hockey players
Canadian ice hockey centres
Cornwall Royals (OHL) players
Ice hockey people from British Columbia
Ice hockey people from Ontario
Kingston Frontenacs players
Long Beach Ice Dogs (IHL) players
Los Angeles Kings players
Newmarket Royals players
New York Rangers players
Sportspeople from Mississauga
Sportspeople from New Westminster
Phoenix Roadrunners (IHL) players
St. Louis Blues draft picks
St. Louis Blues players
Vancouver Canucks players